The 2003 Asian PGA Tour, titled as the 2003 Davidoff Tour for sponsorship reasons, was the ninth season of the Asian PGA Tour, the main men's professional golf tour in Asia excluding Japan.

It was the final season in which the tour was operated by the Asian PGA.

Schedule
The following table lists official events during the 2003 season.

Order of Merit
The Order of Merit was based on prize money won during the season, calculated in U.S. dollars.

Awards

Notes

References

Asian PGA Tour
Asian Tour